Agatha Bennett (1919–2006) was an American artist. She is associated with the Gee's Bend quilting collective, alongside her mother-in-law, Delia Bennett. Her work is included in the collection of the High Museum of Art.

Early life and family 
Bennett was born in Gee's Bend at the Herbert Hall Wilkinson Plantation. She was raised by her grandparents, Emma and Jacob Coleman.  She and Rev. Pernell Bennett married in 1940 and raised 14 children together subsistence farming, working for canning factories, and wood mills.

Quilt maker 
Bennett was a member of the Gee's Bend quilting collective.

Legacy 
Through interviews with her husband, Souls Grown Deep Foundation documented Agatha's personal life and development as a quilter.

References 

1919 births
2006 deaths
20th-century American women artists
20th-century American artists
Artists from Alabama
Quilters
African-American women artists
20th-century African-American women
20th-century African-American people
20th-century African-American artists
21st-century African-American people
21st-century African-American women